is an EP released by The Gazette on October 1, 2003. The first press edition came housed in a glossy paper case, with pictures of the band members and the lyrics for the EP.

Track listing

Notes
Hankou Seimeibun was re-released in 2005.
"Hankou Seimeibun", the fifth track, is a bonus track, found only on the first pressings of the album.

References

The Gazette (band) albums
2004 EPs